Batticaloa Electoral District ( Maṭṭakkaḷappu Tērtal Māvaṭṭam) is one of the 22 multi-member electoral districts of Sri Lanka created by the 1978 Constitution of Sri Lanka. The district is conterminous with the administrative district of Batticaloa in the Eastern province. The district currently elects 5 of the 225 members of the Sri Lankan Parliament and had 344,750 registered electors in 2010.

Election results

1982 presidential election
Results of the 1st presidential election held on 20 October 1982:

1988 provincial council election
Results of the 1st North Eastern provincial council election held on 19 November 1988:

1988 presidential election
Results of the 2nd presidential election held on 19 December 1988:

1989 parliamentary general election
Results of the 9th parliamentary election held on 15 February 1989:

The following candidates were elected: G. Karunakaran (TELO), 25,651 preference votes (pv); Alathipody Gunaseelan (EROS), 22,889 pv; Prince Casinader (EPRLF), 21,959 pv; Sam Tambimuttu (EPRLF), 19,431 pv; and M. L. A. M. Hizbullah (SLMC), 15,832 pv.

Sam Tambimuttu (EPRLF) was killed on 7 May 1990. His replacement was Joseph Pararajasingham (TULF).

1994 parliamentary general election
Results of the 10th parliamentary election held on 16 August 1994:

The following candidates were elected: Joseph Pararajasingham (TULF), 43,350 preference votes (pv); P. Selvarasa (TULF), 17,450 pv; K. Thurairajasingam (TULF),15,974 pv; M. L. A. M. Hizbullah (SLMC), 12,583 pv; and Seyed Ali Zahir Moulana (UNP), 11,508 pv.

1994 presidential election
Results of the 3rd presidential election held on 9 November 1994:

1999 presidential election
Results of the 4th presidential election held on 21 December 1999:

2000 parliamentary general election
Results of the 11th parliamentary election held on 10 October 2000:

The following candidates were elected: Abdul Cader (NUA), 22,975 preference votes (pv); Nimalan Soundaranayagam (TULF), 16,542 pv; Seyed Ali Zahir Moulana (UNP), 14,284 pv; Joseph Pararajasingham (TULF), 12,605 pv; and S. Ganeshamoorthy (PA), 9,132 pv.

Nimalan Soundaranayagam (TULF) was killed on 7 November 2000.

2001 parliamentary general election
Results of the 12th parliamentary election held on 5 December 2001:

The following candidates were elected: T. Thangavadivel (TNA-TELO), 24,475 preference votes (pv); G. Krishnapillai (TNA-ACTC), 20,675 pv; Joseph Pararajasingham (TNA-TULF), 20,279 pv; M. L. A. M. Hizbullah (PA), 19,787 pv; and M. B. Mohideen Abdul Cader (SLMC), 17,497 pv.

2004 parliamentary general election
Results of the 13th parliamentary election held on 2 April 2004:

The following candidates were elected: Thanmanpillai Kanagasabai (TNA), 57,843 preference votes (pv); Thangeswary Kathiraman (TNA), 50,545 pv; Senathirajah Jeyanandamoorthy (TNA), 44,457 pv; Kingsley Rasanayagam (TNA), 38,633 pv; and Ali Ameer Shihabdeen (SLMC), 21,232 pv.

Kingsley Rasanayagam (TNA) resigned shortly after being elected. His replacement P. Ariyanethiran (TNA) was sworn in on 18 May 2004.

2005 presidential election
Results of the 5th presidential election held on 17 November 2005:

2008 provincial council election
Results of the 1st Eastern provincial council election held on 10 May 2008:

The following candidates were elected: S. Chandrakanthan (UPFA-TMVP); Basheer Segu Dawood (UNP-SLMC); Edwin Silva Krishnanandaharajah (UPFA); M. L. A. M. Hizbullah (UPFA); Thambimuththu Alosiyas Masilamany (UNP); Aliyar Salih Javahir Salih (UPFA); Arasaretnam Sasitharan (UNP); Muhamed Sharief Subair (UPFA); Nagalingam Thiraviyam (UPFA); R. Thurairatnam (TDNA-EPRLF); and Ameertheen Vellathamby (UNP).

2010 presidential election
Results of the 6th presidential election held on 26 January 2010:

2010 parliamentary general election
Results of the 14th parliamentary election held on 8 April 2010:

The following candidates were elected: M. L. A. M. Hizbullah (UPFA-ACMC), 22,256 preference votes (pv); S. Yogeswaran (TNA), 20,569 pv; P. Selvarasa (TNA), 18,485 pv; P. Ariyanethiran (TNA), 16,504 pv; and Basheer Segu Dawood (UNF), 11,678 pv.

2012 provincial council election
Results of the 2nd Eastern provincial council election held on 8 September 2012:

The following candidates were elected:
R. Thurairatnam (TNA-EPRLF), 29,141 preference votes (pv); K. Thurairajasingam (TNA-ITAK), 27,717 pv; S. Chandrakanthan (UPFA-TMVP), 22,338 pv; Ali Ameer Shihabdeen (UPFA-ACMC), 21,271 pv; Abdul Farook Mohamed Shibly (UPFA-ACMC), 20,407 pv; G. Krishnapillai (TNA-TULF), 20,200 pv; Abtul Shareef Subair (UPFA-ACMC), 17,903 pv; N. Indirakumar (TNA-TELO), 17,304 pv; M. Nadarajah (TNA-ITAK), 16,681 pv; G. Karunakaran (TNA-TELO), 16,536 pv; and Agamed Nazeer Zainulabdeen (SLMC), 11,401 pv.

References

Politics of Batticaloa District
Electoral districts of Sri Lanka